No se mande, profe (Not known to have been distributed in English, but title equates with "Don't Get Fresh, Prof") is a 1969 Mexican film directed by Alfredo B. Crevenna. It stars Enrique Guzman and Hilda Aguirre.

Plot 
Prudish teacher at a girl’s school unleashes his wild side when he debuts as a pop singer in his spare time.

Cast 
 Enrique Guzmán
 Hilda Aguirre
 Sara García
 Héctor Suárez
 Amadee Chabot
 Bertha Moss
 Renata Seydel
 Beatriz Mayo
 Fanny Schiller
 Claudia Martell
 Sergio Ramos
 Queta Lavat
 Burdette Zea
 Juan Miranda
 Armando Acosta
 Dolores Camarillo
 Queta Carrasco

References

External links 
 

1969 films
Mexican comedy films
1960s Spanish-language films
1960s Mexican films